Northeastern United States, Northeast United States or Northeast region within the United States may refer to:

 Northeastern United States, one of four U.S. Census Bureau regions
 Northeast megalopolis, the heavily urbanized area of the U.S. stretching from Boston to Washington
 Northeast Region, an administrative division of the U.S. National Park Service
 Northeast Region (Boy Scouts of America)

See also
 Atlantic Northeast
 Northeast blackout of 2003
 Northeast Climate Science Center
 Northeast Corridor, a fully electrified railway line that serves the Northeast megalopolis of the United States 
 Northeast Conference
 Northeast Operating Rules Advisory Committee
 Northeast Regional, an Amtrak rail route
 Northeast Regional Board of Dental Examiners
 Northeast Regional Ocean Council, an organization created to facilitate coastal conservation
 Northeast (disambiguation)
 North Eastern Athletic Conference

Northeastern United States